The women's lightweight double sculls competition at the 2010 Asian Games in Guangzhou, China was held from 14 November to 18 November at the International Rowing Centre.

Schedule 
All times are China Standard Time (UTC+08:00)

Results 
Legend
DNS — Did not start

Heats 
 Qualification: 1 → Final (FA), 2–4 → Repechage (R)

Heat 1

Heat 2

Repechage 
 Qualification: 1–4 → Final (FA)

Final

References 

Results

External links 
Official Website

Rowing at the 2010 Asian Games - Women's lightweight double sculls